Living color or colour could refer to 

 Living Colour, an American rock band
 In Living Color,  American sketch comedy television series that was produced in the early 1990s
 "in living color", part of NBC's slogan during the introduction of its peacock logo in the late 1950s
 Living Color (film), a 1992 Australian movie
 Television's Greatest Hits: In Living Color , part of TVT Records's Television's Greatest Hits series